Ganeshrao Nagorao Dudhgaonkar is an Indian politician from Parbhani, Maharashtra. He was member of the 15th Lok Sabha of India representing Parbhani constituency. He was also member of Maharashtra Legislative Assembly  in 1980 and 1985 representing Basmath and Jintur respectively. He has been into Indian National Congress, Shiv Sena  and Nationalist Congress Party ahead of the 2019 Maharashtra Legislative Assembly election he joined Vanchit Bahujan Aghadi.

Personal life
Dudhgaonkar married Dr Sandhya on 2 June 1970 The couple has one son and one daughter. his son Sameer joined BJP in 2018 and his wife Dr Sandhya is a professor.

References

External links
 Fifteenth Lok Sabha Members Bioprofile - Dudhgaonkar, Shri Ganeshrao Nagorao

Living people
1945 births
India MPs 2009–2014
People from Parbhani
Marathi politicians
Shiv Sena politicians
Lok Sabha members from Maharashtra
People from Marathwada